Hagit Messer Yaron (born May 13, 1953) is an Israeli electrical engineer and businesswoman. She is a professor of electrical engineering. She is the Kranzberg Chair Professor in Signal Processing at Tel Aviv University. She was the President of Open University of Israel from 2008 to 2013.

Biography 
Messer Yaron was born and raised in Ramat HaSharon. Her mother Tova was a biology teacher and her father Oded served as a director general at the Ministry of Labor and as the Supervisor of Banks in Bank of Israel.
Messer Yaron graduated from Tel Aviv University in 1977, and completed her Ph.D. in Electrical Engineering there in 1984, under the supervision of Yeheskel Bar-Ness. After Post-Doc at Yale University with Peter M. Schultheiss she joined the Faculty of Engineering at Tel Aviv University in 1986. Messer Yaron is married and mother of three.

Contributions 
Messer focuses on statistical signal processing with applications to source localization, communication and environmental monitoring. She has published numerous journal and conference papers, and several patents, and has supervised more than 100 graduate students. In 2006, Messer was the first to suggest using commercial microwave links for rainfall monitoring, and become the world pioneer in opportunistic sensing of the environment. 

She is also interested in various aspects of higher-education and science policy, including: 
 Ethics in Science and Technology.  Messer Yaron is a member of COMEST and of the Executive Board of the IEEE global initiative on ethics of autonomous and intelligent systems
 Commercialization of academic research and Technology Transfer.  She has several publications on the topic and she serves as a consultant to WIPO on IP policy for universities
 Messer Yaron is committed to the advancement of women in science and technology. She has founded the national council for the advancement of women in science in Israel and served as its 1st chair (2000-2004) and has been on the founding board of the European platform of women scientists.

Among her doctoral students throughout the years, are counted Prof. Joseph Tabrikian (Ben-Gurion University), Prof. Itsik Bargal (Bar-Ilan University) and the senior lecturers Dr. Jonatan Ostrometzky (Tel Aviv University) and Dr. Yair Noam (Bar-Ilan University).

Public Service 
Over the years she has held numerous administrative positions, including:
 The Chief Scientist at the Israeli Ministry of Science, Culture and Sport (2000-2003); 
 The head of the Porter School of Environmental Studies  (2004-2006);
 The Vice President for Research and Development at Tel Aviv University (2006-2008);
 The President of the Open University of Israel  (2008-2013);
 The Vice Chair of the Council for Higher Education in Israel (2013-2016).

In 2016 she  also became a co-founder of ClimaCell.

Recognition 
 The IEEE Clementina Saduwa Award 2020
 Finalist in the ICASSP 2020 Best paper award (4/730) and Best paper Student Award (8/1170) - coauthor
 IEEE Life Fellow, from January 1, 2019
 PIFI fellow, Visiting Scientist Award, Chinese Academy of Sciences, President’s International Fellowship Initiative (PIFI), 2018
 Member of “The Directors Team (2017, 2022)”
 The Kranzberg Chair in Signal Processing, TAU, 2016
 Honorary Fellow of the Open University, Israel, 2016
 2011 SPS Signal Processing Magazine Best Column Award for Messer, H: "Rainfall Monitoring Using Cellular Networks"; [In the Spotlight], IEEE SIGNAL PROCESSING MAGAZINE, Vol. 24, No. 3, May 2007
 Panelist, United Nations commission on the status of women, fifty-fifth session, February 2011
 WIPO (World Intellectual Property Organization) Medal, 2009, "for the best invention to predict floods using cellular networks" (with N. David and P. Alpert).
 IEEE Geoscience and Remote Sensing Letters (GRSL) Best Reviewer Recognition for 2009
 General co-Chair, IEEE SAM-2010, IEEE HOS-1999 Workshops
 Member of the Editorial Board, Overview Articles in IEEE Signal Processing Transactions (2009-2012)
 Member of the Editorial Board, IEEE Journal on Selected Topics in Signal Processing (2006-2010)
 Fellow of the IEEE (2001): for contributions to statistical signal processing, time delay estimation and sensor array processing.
 Associate Editor, IEEE Signal Processing Letters (1996-9)
 Associate Editor, IEEE Trans. On Signal Processing (1994-6)
 Member, IEEE Signal Processing Society Technical Committees (SPTM, SAM) – 1994-2010.
 Best Teacher Award, Faculty of Engineering (1997)
 Plenary/keynotes talks in international conferences: SPAWC2007, SAM2008,SAM2012, EUCON2013, CEST2017, COMCAS2018, AICT2019, ICASSP2020, ICAS2021

References

External links 
 Profile Page, Tel Aviv University site
 Climacell webpage

1953 births
Living people
Fellow Members of the IEEE
Israeli electrical engineers
Israeli company founders
Israeli women engineers
Tel Aviv University alumni
Academic staff of Tel Aviv University
Presidents of universities in Israel